The 2008-2009 Boston College Eagles men's ice hockey team represented Boston College in the 2008-2009 college hockey season. The team was coached by Jerry York, '67, his fifteenth season behind the bench at Boston College. The Eagles played their home games at Kelley Rink on the campus of Boston College, and competed in Hockey East.

Boston College entered the season as defending National Champions after defeating Notre Dame in the 2008 NCAA Tournament Championship game for the program's third National Championship. The Eagles raised their 2008 title banner to the rafters of Kelley Rink in their home opener against Wisconsin on October 10, 2008.

The 2008-09 season was a generally poor one for the Eagles, as the team did not make the NCAA Tournament for the first time since 2002, and failed to defend both their Hockey East Tournament and Beanpot titles from the previous year.

Senior Brock Bradford captained the 2008-09 team after missing most of the 2007-08 season with an arm injury.

Recruiting 
Boston College added nine freshmen for the 2008-2009 season, including three defensemen, five forwards, and one goalie.

2008–2009 roster

Departures from 2007–2008 team 
 Mike Brennan, D - Graduation
 Joe Adams, F - Graduation
 Pat Gannon, F - Graduation
 Matt Greene, F - Graduation
 Dan Bertram, F - Graduation
 Nathan Gerbe, F - signed with BUF

2008-2009 Eagles

Standings

Schedule

2008–2009 regular season 

All times Eastern

* = Hockey East Conference Play

Beanpot = 57th Annual Beanpot Tournament in Boston

2009 Post-Season

References

External links 
 BC Men's Hockey Home Page
 BC Men's Hockey Page on USCHO

2008-09
Boston College Eagles
Boston College Eagles
Boston College Eagles men's ice hockey season
Boston College Eagles men's ice hockey season
Boston College Eagles men's ice hockey season
Boston College Eagles men's ice hockey season